James Stewart Murray (born 13 July 1983) is a British Labour and Co-operative politician who has served as Shadow Financial Secretary to the Treasury since 2020. He has been the Member of Parliament (MP) for Ealing North since the 2019 general election. From 2016 to 2019, he was Deputy Mayor for Housing for the Mayor of London, Sadiq Khan.

Early life
Murray was born in Hammersmith to parents Geoffrey and Lynne Murray. His mother Lynne was a Labour councillor for Cleveland ward in Ealing from 2014 to 2018. He grew up in West Ealing, attending an independent school, before studying PPE at Wadham College, Oxford. Murray graduated with a BA First Class Honours degree in 2004.

Political career
Murray served as a councillor in Islington from 2006 to 2016, representing Barnsbury ward, centred on the area of the same name. He was the borough's Executive Member for Housing and Development from 2010 to 2016. In this role, Inside Housing reported that he "proved himself to be a tough negotiator who knows what he wants".

He advised Sadiq Khan during his successful selection and election campaigns to become Mayor of London, and was appointed by Khan as London's Deputy Mayor for Housing in 2016. As a Deputy Mayor, Murray oversaw the Mayor's £4.8bn affordable homes programme, and launched the first-ever City Hall initiative dedicated to building council homes. This programme, Building Council Homes for Londoners, boosted council homebuilding to its highest level in 34 years.

He was elected as Member of Parliament for Ealing North in December 2019 and gave his maiden speech in January 2020. He became a member of the Health and Social Care Committee in March 2020 and was appointed to the Opposition Whips' Office in April 2020. On 16 October 2020, he was appointed Shadow Financial Secretary to the Treasury, following the resignation of Dan Carden the previous day relating the Covert Human Intelligence Sources (Criminal Conduct) Bill.

As Shadow Financial Secretary to the Treasury, he has lead for the Opposition on legislation including several finance bills, and bills affecting stamp duty and National Insurance Contributions.

Personal life
Murray lives in West Ealing with his husband Tom Griffiths. In the late 2000s, Murray was diagnosed with Myasthenia gravis. He received treatment at the National Hospital for Neurology and Neurosurgery, Queen Square, and is now symptom-free.

References

External links

Living people
1983 births
Alumni of Wadham College, Oxford
Gay politicians
Labour Co-operative MPs for English constituencies
LGBT members of the Parliament of the United Kingdom
English LGBT politicians
People from Hammersmith
UK MPs 2019–present